The replacing of loanwords in Turkish is part of a policy of Turkification of Atatürk. The Ottoman Turkish language had many loanwords from Arabic and Persian, but also European languages such as French, Greek, and Italian origin—which were officially replaced with their Turkish counterparts suggested by the Turkish Language Association (TDK) as a part of the cultural reforms—in the broader framework of Atatürk's Reforms—following the foundation of the Republic of Turkey.

The TDK, established by Atatürk in 1932 to research the Turkish language, also sought to replace foreign loanwords (mainly Arabic) with their Turkish counterparts. The Association succeeded in removing several hundred Arabic words from the language. While most of the words introduced into the language in this process were newly derived from existing Turkish verbal roots, TDK also suggested using old Turkish words which had not been used in the language for centuries; like yanıt, birey, gözgü. Most of these words are used today widely while their predecessors are not used in daily language anymore. Some words were used before language reform too but they were used much less than the Persian ones. Some words were taken from rural areas but most of them had different meanings, like ürün. Mongolian also played an important role too, because Mongolian preserved the old Turkic borrowings, such as ulus and çağ. 

There are generational differences in vocabulary preference. While those born before the 1940s tend to use the old Arabic-origin words (even the obsolete ones), younger generations commonly use the newer expressions. Some new words have not been widely adopted, in part because they failed to convey the intrinsic meanings of their old equivalents. Many new words have taken up somewhat different meanings, and cannot necessarily be used interchangeably with their old counterpart.

Connotations and implications of word choice
Historically, Arabic was the language of the mosque and Persian was the language of education and poetry. A deliberate usage of either (eschewing the usage of a "western" word) often implies a religious subtext or romanticism, respectively. Similarly, the use of European words may be favored to impart a perceived "modern" character. The use of "pure Turkic" words may be employed as an expression of nationalism or as a linguistic "simplification".

Word derivations
Most of the new Turkish words are derived from other words with thematic suffixes. For example:

 is the root of the verb , which means "to sink" or "to set". The derived word  means "west" or the cardinal direction in which the sun "sinks". This is derived from the word , which means "moon, month".

Here are some other examples of derivations:

  means "day" →  means "agenda",  means "current",  means "current events and news",  means "to update",  means "date",  means "south",  means "sun",  means "diary" or "daily",  means "daytime" (opposite of night) or "morning",
  is the root of the verb "to cut" →  means "incision",  means "cutter",  means "accurate",  means "definitely",  means "to become definite",  means "the state of indefinity",  means "to pretend to hit with a hand motion",  is a saying that means "the agreement of cutting a fruit before buying it",  means "adze",  means "sudden feeling of tiredness, lethargy",  means "to act like something",  means "cross section",  means "chisel",  means "sharp",  means "acuity" and "sharpness",  means "segment",  means "animal (or tree) fit or ready to be slaughtered/cut",  means "interruption",  means "on and off",  means "uninterrupted" and "seamless",  means "an object cut in the form of a geometrical shape",  means "short-cut",  means "interrupted",  means "to forecast" and "to nap",  means "guess",  means "a line that intersects a geometrical entity",  means "deduction",  means "to intersect",  means "intersection",
  is the root of the verb "to deviate" →  means "pervert",  means "turn" (as in roads, traffic),
  is the root of the verb "to hear", "to feel" →  means "sensory",  means "sensitive",  means "sensitivity",  means "feeling",  means "sensor",  means "allergen",  means "allergy",  means "hearsay",  means "apathy",
  is the root of the verb "to suffice" →  means "sufficient",  means "authority",  means "talent",
  means "other" →  means "metamorphosis",
  means "single" →  means "monopoly",  means "monotonous",
  means "home" →  means "marriage",  means "domestic",
  is the root of the verb "to choose" →  means "choice",  means "elite",  means "election",
  is the root of the verb "to fall" →  means "miscarriage",
  is the root of the verb "to last", "to put forward" →  means "chronic",  means "version",
  is the root of the verb "to write" →  means "writer",  means "fate",  means "software",  means "report",  means "inscription",  means "secretary",  means "printer",  means "literature",  means "orthography",  means "correspondence",  means "dictation",
  is the root of the verb "to give" →  means "data",  means "tax",  means "efficiency",
  means "self", "real" →  means "special",  means "attention",  means "peculiar",  means "specific",  means "other",  means "subject",  means "original",  means "free",  means "assimilation",  means "subjective".

Some of the Turkish words are also compound words, such as:

  means "application".
  means "foot", and  means "container", and the compound word  means foot-container, "shoe".
  means "main", and  means "law", and the compound word  means "constitution".
  means "self", and  means "giving", and the compound word  means "altruism, self-sacrifice".
  means "big", and  means "messenger", and the compound word  means "ambassador".
  means "cutting",  means "house", and  means "slaughterhouse".

For more information, see the related article: Turkish vocabulary.

Lists of replaced loanwords

Loanwords of Arabic origin
The list gives the Ottoman Turkish word, the modern spelling of the word in Turkish (as suggested by TDK), the modern Turkish equivalent, and its meaning in English. Arabs also used the following words as loanwords for their language.

* Old words that are still used in modern Turkish together with their new Turkish counterparts.
** New words that are not as frequently used as the old words.

Loanwords of French origin
French words started to infiltrate the Turkish language in the 1800s, when administrative reforms (Tanzimat) started taking place in the Ottoman Empire. The extent of French influence was such that the number of French loanwords was close to 5,000.

Most of the French loanwords are still widely used in Turkish today.

* Words that are still used in modern Turkish together with their new Turkish counterparts.

Loanwords of Persian origin
The list gives the Ottoman Turkish word, the modern spelling of the word in Turkish (as suggested by TDK), the modern Turkish equivalent, and its meaning in English.

Most of the original Persian words are still widely used in modern Turkish. In fact, there are over 1,500 Persian words in Turkish. However, for many of the Persian words (unlike Arabic words), there is no TDK-prescribed equivalent. TDK did not put as much effort into replacing Persian words as it did for Arabic words, largely because the Persian words were better assimilated into the language. Arabic language and culture is general perceived by Turks to be more "foreign" than Persian language and culture, which had a native presence in Anatolia since the time of the Achaemenids, and was patronised for millennia afterwards by other dynasties with a presence in Anatolia such as the Sasanians, Seleucids, Seljuks, Sultanate of Rum, and lastly, the Ottomans, amongst others.

* New words that are not as frequently used as the old words.

Loanwords of other origin
* Words that are still used in modern Turkish together with their new Turkish counterparts.

See also
 Animal name changes in Turkey
 Geographical name changes in Turkey
 List of French loanwords in Persian

Notes

Sources
 Yazım Kılavuzu, the official spelling guide of the Turkish language on TDK website

replaced loan words in Turkish
Turkish words and phrases
Loanwords
Turkish loan
Turkish